Sergeý Krowýakow (born April 1 1991 in Ashgabat, Turkmen SSR) is a Turkmenistani swimmer. At the 2012 Summer Olympics, he competed in the Men's 100 metre freestyle, finishing in 46th place overall in the heats, failing to qualify for the semifinals. He also competed in the 100 m event at the 2013 World Aquatics Championships.

References

Turkmenistan male freestyle swimmers
1991 births
Living people
Sportspeople from Ashgabat 
Olympic swimmers of Turkmenistan
Swimmers at the 2012 Summer Olympics
Swimmers at the 2014 Asian Games
Asian Games competitors for Turkmenistan